Jeffrey Agnew (born August 17, 1965) is an American professional stock car racing driver. He last competed part-time in the NASCAR Camping World Truck Series, driving the No. 27 for Hillman Racing in 2013.

Racing career
Agnew made his debut in racing in 1978 running late models, he competed against Darrell Waltrip and Bobby Allison in one race that year.

He is most well-known for his success as a competitor in the Hooters Pro Cup Series, where he was the champion of the 1998 and 2011 seasons. The 1998 championship came with future NASCAR Cup Series crew chief Darian Grubb serving in that same capacity for Agnew. He also won the 2003 Hooters Pro Cup Series regular season (competing only in the Northern Division races). Agnew ended his career in the series with 20 wins, 97 Top-5 and 153 Top-10 finishes in 237 starts.

Agnew also captured six track titles, two each at Motor Mile Speedway, Lonesome Pine Raceway and Kingsport Speedway. He is listed 4th in Motor Mile Speedway late model all-time wins list with 48 wins.

In 2011 at age 45, he made his NASCAR debut, competing in three events in NASCAR Camping World Truck Series. He then competed in 11 events in the 2012 season and 15 races in 2013, including a combined effort between Team 7 Motorsports and Hillman Racing. He ended his NASCAR career with 29 starts. His best finish was 14th at Martinsville Speedway in 2011.

Motorsports career results

NASCAR

Camping World Truck Series

References

External links
 

Living people
1965 births
NASCAR drivers
Racing drivers from Virginia
People from Floyd County, Virginia